Touchstone was a band led by Irish musician Tríona Ní Dhomhnaill of The Bothy Band and Zan McLeod, who had worked with singer and songwriter Mike Cross.  The band's music was traditional Irish music with some bluegrass music influence. Based in Chapel Hill, North Carolina, Touchstone was active in the early 1980s, touring throughout the United States.  They recorded two albums for Green Linnet Records before disbanding in the mid 1980s.

Discography 

 The New Land (1982)
 Jealousy (1984)

References

External links 
 Allmusic guide

Musical groups from North Carolina
Musical groups established in 1982
Musical groups disestablished in 1984
1982 establishments in North Carolina
Green Linnet Records artists